Grieve is a surname. Notable people with the surname include:

 Andrew Grieve (born 1939), Welsh television and film director
 Basil Grieve (1864–1917), English cricketer
 Ben Grieve (born 1976), American former Major League baseball player
 Bessie Grieve (1923-1996), aka Bessie Skea, Orkney writer
 Bill Grieve (1900-1979), American baseball umpire
 Brent Grieve (born 1969), Canadian former ice hockey player
 Brian Grieve (1907–1997), Australian botanist
 C. M. Grieve (1892–1978), Scottish writer
 David Grieve (1808-1889) Scottish geologist
 Dominic Grieve (born 1956), British politician and barrister
 Gordon Grieve (1912–1993), New Zealand politician
 Harold Grieve (1901–1993), American motion picture art director
 Very Rev Henry Grieve (1738-1810) Moderator of the General Assembly of the Church of Scotland in 1783
 Iain Grieve (born 1987), Botswana-born rugby union player
 James Nicol Grieve (1855–1918), Ontario farmer and political figure
 Jock Grieve (1887–1955), Scottish footballer
 John Grieve (actor) (1924–2003), Scottish actor
 John Grieve (Lord Provost) (d.1803) Lord Provost of Edinburgh
 John Grieve (physician) (1753-1805) Scottish physician linked to the Russian royal family
 John Grieve (police officer) (born 1946), British police officer
 John Grieve (VC) (1821–1863), Scottish Victoria Cross recipient
 Ken Grieve, British television director
 Mary Grieve (1906–1998), Scottish magazine editor and journalist
 Maud Grieve (1858–1931), English horticulturalist and herbalist
 Ollie Grieve (1920–1978), Australian rules footballer
 Percy Grieve (1915–1998), British Conservative Party politician
 Richard Grieve (born 1970), Australian actor
 Robert Grieve (town planner) (1910-1995) Scottish town planner
 Robert Cuthbert Grieve (1889–1957), Australian Victoria Cross recipient
 Tom Grieve (born 1948), American former Major League baseball player
 Walter B. Grieve (1850–1921), Newfoundland merchant and politician
 William Grieve (disambiguation)

See also
 Greve (surname)
 Grieves (surname)